Luke Durbridge (born 9 April 1991) is an Australian road and track cyclist, who currently rides for UCI WorldTeam . Durbridge specialises in the individual time trial, road races, and various track cycling events.

As well as winning the 2012 Australian National Time Trial Championships, Durbridge won both the time trial and the Australian National Road Race Championships in 2013. As a result, he became the first rider to win both titles in the same year at an elite level, Jonathan Hall had previously won both in 1997 but not at an elite level.

Early career
Durbridge was born in Greenmount, Western Australia, and started cycling at 14 years of age, competing in triathlons. In 2009 he became the World Junior Individual Time Trial Champion at the UCI Juniors World Championships in Moscow, Russia; he also won gold in the World Junior Madison Championship. In 2010 he became the youngest ever medal winner in the U23 Individual time trial event of the UCI Road World Championships.

Professional road career
Durbridge joined the  team ahead of the 2012 season, which coincided with him being dropped from the Australian track team. After winning the under-23 national time trial title in 2011, Durbridge became the elite national champion in January 2012, beating teammate and two-time defending champion Cameron Meyer by almost seven seconds. His first professional win came in April 2012, taking the overall title at the Circuit de la Sarthe despite being left with only two teammates for the final stage. In June he unexpectedly won the prologue of the Critérium du Dauphiné, beating Bradley Wiggins and world time trial champion Tony Martin. He subsequently finished fifth in the Eneco Tour before taking his second general classification win of the year at the 2.1-category Tour du Poitou-Charentes.

In 2021, Durbridge rode in the Olympic road race for the first time at the COVID-19 pandemic-delayed 2020 Summer Olympics in Tokyo, where he finished in 72nd place.

Major results

2008
 UCI Junior Track Cycling World Championships
1st  Team pursuit
3rd  Points race
 1st  Team pursuit, 2008–09 UCI Track Cycling World Cup Classics, Melbourne
2009
 UCI Juniors Track World Championships
1st  Madison
2nd  Team pursuit
 1st  Time trial, UCI Juniors World Championships
 1st  Team pursuit, 2009–10 UCI Track Cycling World Cup Classics, Melbourne
 1st  Team pursuit, National Track Championships
 National Junior Road Championships
1st  Time trial
4th Road race
2010
 1st  Overall Mersey Valley Tour
1st Prologue
 1st Memorial Davide Fardelli
 1st Stage 1 (TTT) Thüringen Rundfahrt der U23
 2nd  Time trial, UCI Under-23 Road World Championships
 National Track Championships
2nd  Team pursuit
2nd  Points race
 2nd Time trial, National Under-23 Road Championships
 3rd  Time trial, Commonwealth Games
 3rd Chrono Champenois
2011
 1st  Team pursuit, UCI Track World Championships
 1st  Time trial, UCI Under-23 Road World Championships
 1st  Time trial, National Under-23 Road Championships
 1st  Points race, National Track Championships
 1st Chrono Champenois
 3rd Memorial Davide Fardelli
 7th Overall Olympia's Tour
1st Prologue & Stage 5 (ITT)
2012
 1st  Time trial, National Road Championships
 1st  Overall Circuit de la Sarthe
1st  Young rider classification
1st Stage 3 (ITT)
 1st  Overall Tour du Poitou-Charentes
1st  Young rider classification
1st Stage 4 (ITT)
 1st Prologue Critérium du Dauphiné
 1st Duo Normand (with Svein Tuft)
 3rd  Team time trial, UCI Road World Championships
 5th Overall Eneco Tour
1st Stage 2 (TTT)
 7th Overall Three Days of De Panne
2013
 National Road Championships
1st  Road race
1st  Time trial
 1st Duo Normand (with Svein Tuft)
 1st Bay Classic Series
 1st Stage 3 (ITT) Circuit de la Sarthe
 2nd  Team time trial, UCI Road World Championships
 6th Overall Tour du Poitou-Charentes
 7th Overall Three Days of De Panne
2014
 Oceania Road Championships
1st  Road race
8th Time trial
 Giro d'Italia
1st Stage 1 (TTT)
Held  after Stage 1
 2nd  Team time trial, UCI Road World Championships
 2nd Time trial, National Road Championships
 2nd Overall Three Days of De Panne
 9th Time trial, Commonwealth Games
2015
 1st Stage 1 (TTT) Giro d'Italia
 4th Time trial, National Road Championships
 7th Overall Three Days of De Panne
2016
 1st Duo Normand (with Svein Tuft)
 3rd  Team time trial, UCI Road World Championships
 6th Overall Three Days of De Panne
2017
 1st Stage 3b (ITT) Three Days of De Panne
 2nd Time trial, National Road Championships
 4th Dwars door Vlaanderen
 4th E3 Harelbeke
 6th Strade Bianche
2018
 2nd Time trial, National Road Championships
  Combativity award Stage 18 Tour de France
2019
 National Road Championships
1st  Time trial
4th Road race
 1st Stage 1 (TTT) Tirreno–Adriatico
 1st Stage 1 (TTT) Czech Cycling Tour
2020
 National Road Championships
1st  Time trial
4th Road race
 1st Stage 1 (TTT) Czech Cycling Tour
2021
 1st  Overall Santos Festival of Cycling
1st Stage 1
 2nd Time trial, National Road Championships
 6th Overall Benelux Tour
2022
 2nd Time trial, National Road Championships
 3rd  Team relay, UCI Road World Championships

Grand Tour general classification results timeline

References

External links

1991 births
Living people
Australian male cyclists
UCI Track Cycling World Champions (men)
Commonwealth Games bronze medallists for Australia
Cyclists at the 2010 Commonwealth Games
Sportsmen from Western Australia
Australian Institute of Sport cyclists
Cyclists at the 2014 Commonwealth Games
Commonwealth Games medallists in cycling
Australian track cyclists
Olympic cyclists of Australia
Cyclists at the 2020 Summer Olympics
Cyclists from Perth, Western Australia
20th-century Australian people
21st-century Australian people
Medallists at the 2010 Commonwealth Games